Shudder may refer to:
Shivering
Shudder (album), a 2008 album by American band Bayside
Shudder (streaming service) a subscription-based horror streaming service